is a Japanese anime series produced by Ajia-do Animation Works and Japanese broadcast on NHK since April 10, 1993. It is an adaptation of the manga series Rakudai Ninja Rantarō, written and illustrated by Sōbe Amako. Nintama Rantarō centers on the title character and his friends as they attend a school for budding ninjas. Like the manga on which it is based, there is a considerable amount of anachronisms for comedic purposes; for example, the titular character Rantarō is bespectacled. The anime also references other Japanese media personalities such as Ken Shimura. The series is currently the longest-running anime on NHK. The official English title is Ninjaboy Rantaro.

In July 2011, a live action film version directed by Takashi Miike titled Ninja Kids!!! was released. A sequel was released on July 6, 2013, called .

Cast

First Year Ha Class
 
 
 The main character, a bespectacled first-grade boy who is aiming to become an excellent ninja. Unfortunately, he often gets distracted and prefers to goof off with his friends Kirimaru and Shinbee. Despite not having very good vision, he has fast legs.

 
 
 One of Rantaro's best friends and Tsukkomi. He is an orphan who lost his family and home during a war, and now makes a living doing various part-time jobs. When school isn't in session, he lives with Doi. His primary interest is being obsessed with earning money. He goes crazy whenever he hears the clinging sound of a zeni coin and will go out of his way to obtain it.

 
 
 A rich merchant's son, who quickly became friends with Rantarō at the beginning of the series. He is overweight, a bit slower when it comes to thinking, likes to eat a lot, and often has to be corrected by his friends. Nonetheless, he possesses great power and strength. He often has a runny nose, which can sometimes come in handy. When he has a bad hair day, his hair sticks up like a porcupine's quills and can be used a weapon.

 
 
 First year Hagumi's class president. He is the smartest kid in the class and the most responsible.

 
 
 The son of textile dyers, and something of a neat freak. He is often depicted with a broom or mop. Shares a room with Shouzaemon.

 
 
 His father runs a horse and carriage delivery service. Danzou is very talented with horses because of this. His writing is terribly messy, to the point of illegibility. He has a platonic crush on Seihachi (清八), one of his father’s top employees. Shares a room with Torawaka.

 
 
 His father is in charge of the Satake Rifle Squad. Because of this he has much experience with flintlock rifles, which were rare at the time. He idolizes Shousei, a rifle expert who works for his father. Shares a room with Danzou.

 
 
 A deceptively happy and friendly-looking child who enjoys setting traps. Shares a room with Heidayuu.

 
 
 Heidayū likes traps and has his entire room rigged with them. He shares his room with Sanjiro, who also enjoys traps.

 
 
 Joined first year hagumi late. His main weapon is the katana. Shares a room with Kisanta.

 
 
 A transfer student, he joined first year hagumi late. Collects slugs as a hobby. Shares a room with Kingo.

First Year I Class
 
 

 
 

 
 
 Class President of first year igumi. His marks often suffer when he doesn't have time to study because of his presidential duties.

First Year Ro Class
 
 
 Thrill and suspense.

 
 
 A spooky, gaunt looking boy.

 
 
 Heita is a giant scaredy-cat. Small things often frighten him to the point of making him pee himself.

Second Year
 
 
 Speaks without thinking, and often says too much. He claims to have problems making a friendly face. Enjoys pranking the first years, especially the main trio.

 
 
 A member of the Health Committee. Often seen making midnight snacks, but unfortunately, often drops them, too. He looks very serious but actually has a kind heart and never leaves people who needs help.

 
 
 Has large eyebrows and reddish orange hair. A very serious and sharp student, but sometimes his sharpness can lead to unnecessary details.

 
 
 A quiet boy who is a little dumb, but has a serious personality and often play the role of the tsukkomi.

 
 
 A 2nd-year transfer student who appears in Season 28, his father is a samurai at the Kawataredoki Castle. He is the first character to be reused from Amako Soubei's previous work Hamuko Mairu!.

Third Year
 
 
 Keeps snakes, scorpions, and bugs as pets. He always keeps his poisonous pet snake, Junko, with him, though she often runs away, leaving Magohei to search frantically for her.

 
 
 Has literally no sense of direction. Will dramatically declare "it's this way!" and then go in the complete opposite direction.

 
 
 Also has no sense of direction, but wanders absent mindlessly.

 
 
 A third year who always keeps an eye on Tsugiya and Kanzaki. Has a serious personality but also my-paced in his own way. Recently he developed a sense of responsibility as well.

 
 
 Always practices for everything obsessively.

 
 
 A nintama with little presence, who seems to have inherited the Heath Committee's bad luck.

Fourth Year
 
 
 The ultimate narcissist. Considers himself 'Ninjutsu Gakuen's Number One Idol'. Is very talented with his throwing ring, which he has lovingly named 'Rinko'.

 
 
 An expressionless boy who really loves digging holes. It is hard to keep him interested in anything else. He names all the holes that he digs, and he too is called "The Trap Specialist". Most of the Health Committee members have fallen in his traps.

 
 
 The other self-proclaimed "Number One Idol of Ninjutsu Gakuen". Mikiemon likes guns, cannons, and rifles, and names his and takes them for walks. He also idolizes Shousei, but not to the extent that Torawaka does.

 
 
 A transfer student who's very ambitious on becoming a ninja. He's the only person who laughs whenever Andou-sensei makes a joke.

 
 
 Raised as a hairdresser, his father was an undercover ninja. Eventually joins Ninjutsu Gakuen, and is allowed into fourth year despite having no previous training, because of his skills with his 'split second hairdressing'.

Fifth Year
 
 
 Long eyelashes and black hair are his defining characteristics. Though his grades are superb and he’s earnest and cool, his spontaneous nature was somewhat revealed when he’d failed to realize that the costs of amazake were included in the Explosives Committee’s appropriation. Since he had to carry tofu in the Sport’s Day relay, he is known as the ‘Tofu Kid’. Truthfully he hates this nickname, and in the manga at times he denies liking tofu; however, in actuality he is abundant in tofu knowledge and he seems to like tofu cooking. In the anime he will openly declare his love for tofu and treat others to tofu he has prepared himself. He carries freeze-dried tofu around for a mid-afternoon snack. He is the stand-in committee president for the Explosives Committee and rounds up the underclassmen; even though he is Takamaru’s senpai he adds “san” to his name since he is older. In the musical his weapon of choice is the suntetsu. In the survival orienteering he was paired in a group with Isuke. His surname comes from Kukuchi in Amagasaki.

 
 
 Though his first appearance was injuring the napping Rantarou, Kirimaru, and Shinbei while practicing his jinba technique, his existence was forgotten for a period of 16 years, until he reappeared in the mixed double survival orienteering in a pair with Torawaka, where his name was finally revealed. On the second occasion when he appeared he did not belong to any committee and was encouraged in vol. 47 by the Headmaster to decide which committee to join while each one ran their food stand at their culture festival. It was revealed then he was actually a class president and he ended up joining the class president committee. His specialty weapon is the manrikigusari. He is the airhead type who tends to get wrapped up in things. In the original work he has black hair, however; in the anime his hair is a deep reddish brown. In first person he uses “ore”; to his superiors he uses “boku” or “watashi”. His surname comes from Ohama-cho in Amagasaki, and his name comes from the Kouga ninja Ukai Kanemon.

 
 
 Gentle and full of kindness; he is a senpai that lovingly takes care of his underclassmen. Though his grades are excellent, his bad habit is that he’s always meandering and hesitating with a broad indecisiveness. After thinking too much, he tires and falls asleep right then and there. Of the “three illness of the ninja”, he is the “type who lacks thought”. Also, if he goes near a dry river bed, the moisture will expand his hair. Hachiya Saburou from the same class is often seen borrowing his face, lending them the relation of “fifth-year rogumi’s specialty combination”. Yamada-sensei often says ”his honesty is his weakness”; however, in the 18th volume he passed the survival orienteering while retaining his playfulness. In that survival orienteering he was paired in a group with Ayakashimaru. In the original work Raizou’s hair is black; however, in the anime it is a bright brown. His namesake is from a proverb meaning .

 
 
 A student with a thousand face, to the point that no one, including the school staff, knows his true face. Saburo is a mischievous, calm and cool student who enjoys wearing disguises of just about anyone, and sometimes alternates faces in-between scenes. Saburo most of the time disguises as Raizo considering the two are quite close friends.

 
 
 A student with cheerful, optimistic, energetic and also serious attitude. Hachizaemon features long unkempt dull grey-brown hair. As the head of Biological Committee, he holds responsibility in protecting wildlife from being harmed or hunted, which gains respect from his fellow junior committee members (which is dominated with first years). Attempts of hunting wildlife with his presence will only enrage him.

Sixth Year
 
 
 Is often portrayed as a leader among the 6th year seniors. Monjiro is a strict, serious senior that focuses on training mentally as much as physically, and his committee members often gets forced into his bizarre trainings such as using 10 kg abacus, sleeping in cold lake at midnight, making weapons out of food, etc. Despite his serious commitments into trainings, he is easily approached outside of training and has good relationship as a caring senior towards his juniors. He has a favourite word - gin gin - that who only used when he gets excited, angry, or emotional. On occasional episodes, he together with Choji and Koheta tagged along with Kirimaru in his part-time job.

  
 
 A pale-skinned and often regarded as a handsome senior with long straight and silky hair. He leads the Saho committee along with Heidayu as his favorite junior. He has natural talents for explosive, bombs, grenades, often carrying dozens of them with him for convenient purpose. Being as normally a calm, rationally thinking senior, he is often described as an excellent student among the seniors. When carrying out solo missions, he often gets tagged along with Kisanta and Shinbei, who both look up to him, but instead of giving a good help, burdens him instead and gets him caught, bomb explodes in his face, trees fall down on him, etc. He has shorter temper for Kisanta and Shinbei harassing him in his missions.

 
 
 A student who spoke with few words and with few facial expressions. Choji who speak slowly, that made his words hard to be conveyed at times, is also the head of librarian. Usually, someone who stands besides him (such as Raizo or Kirimaru who are also librarians) had to be the 'translator' especially to those who don't meet Choji quite often. His expressions can get eerie with one big creepy smile, though his true emotions often contrast his face (such as he will smile creepily when he is hurt, and vice versa). Ironically, Shinbei's little sister Kameko found his smile to be attractive, and even had a crush on him at times.

 
 
 Koheita, a sixth-year student with much energy and happy-go-lucky, cheerful, exciting and reckless personality. He made a hobby of digging trenches on soil, sometimes using only a pair of kunai, and sometimes with his bare hands. Apart from that, he also has the tendency to spike just about anything that flies towards him to the ground, like a volleyball spike (which occasionally causes problems to others, and even broke his arm). He is easily approachable by others and treats his juniors that come forward for his help with respect, though sometimes, with reckless running. His favorite word: "Ike Ike Don Don"

 
 
 A student Hagumi that has strong fighting spirit, aggressive and hot tempered, but still cares for his juniors with good tolerant. Tomesaburo and Monjiro are however, tends to argue which then leads them to brawl and fight each other over 'who is better' or 'who is right' matters. His appearance resembles another character in the series, Yoshiro Suzugoya, which was pointed out by Kihachiro. Tomesaburo and Isaku are classmates, and also roommates, and appears to be close.

 
 
 A nice, friendly and caring student of 6th year Hagumi that has a personality akin to a gentle big brother to his juniors, though is cursed with bad luck to himself, and anyone that gets tagged along with him. Also dubbed by others and his own members - 'bad luck chairman' - and his own committee as 'bad luck committee'. As a Health Committee chairman, he takes on his job giving aid to injured or sick person responsibly and unbiased, that he also treated a Tasogaredoki ninja Zatto Konnamon, who was supposing to be an intruder. He and his committee members often gets greeted by Konnamon uninformed, sometimes with presence of other Tasogaredoki ninjas.

Kunoichi Class
 
 
 She's the leader of the kunoichi trio.

 
 
 Tomomi is the class president and part of the kunoichi trio.

 
 
 Shige is the grand daughter of the principal and part of the kunoichi trio. She's in love with Shinbe. She is an anime-only character.

Staff
 
 
 Another teacher of Rantaro. He serves to teach the actual techniques and trains the lazy first graders. Denzo tends to lose his patience faster than Doi. He also shows unnatural fondness in disguising himself as a woman, usually with disastrous results. When he's dressed as a woman, his personality transforms completely too, and he refuses to answer to anything besides 'Denko'. He is Yamada Rikichi's father.

 
 
 Rantarō's main classroom teacher. He often loses patience with Rantaro and his classmates due to their inability to pay attention. His personality appears to have been the inspiration for Iruka Umino, another ninja teacher who is voiced by the same voice actor.

 
 

 
 
 A dog skilled in ninjutsu, he is the longtime companion of the head master. Also in charge of ringing the school bell

 
 
 The teacher of the female nintamas, she alternates between the form of a young woman and an old lady. No one is sure which is her true form.

 
 

 
 
 Shinzaemon Tobe is another teacher at the school, who occasionally appears from time to time. He's a sword instructor who is skilled, but if he doesn't have his daily meals, he loses the strength to even pick up the sword.

 
 
 Andou is the first grade teacher for another class. He often calls Rantaro's class lazy and unproductive, comparing them to his class which seem to do nothing but study all day, thus getting good marks on their tests.

 
 
 A 16-year-old working at Ninjutsu Gakuen's administration. He's longing to become a ninja, but his clumsiness prevents his from being one. Originally belongs to a fan shop family in the same town as Saitō family.

Tasogaredoki Castle
 
 
 Tasogaredoki ninja group's leader. Behind his bandages is a severe burn caused by a fire incident nine years ago. A genius and skillful ninja who's very easy-going, and sits in a very lady-like manner. He's also an acquaintance of Isaku and Fushikizou.

 
 
 A 16-year-old ninja who belongs to Tasogaredoki Castle, Zatto's underling. He's quite a strong fighter, but always has his strength losing to his youthful innocence. He was defeated by Doi Hansuke using only chalks and attendance record, and proclaims a rivalry to him not long after.

 
 
 In command after Zatto together with Oshitsu Osaretsu. He appeared at Ninjutsu Gakuen's cultural festival, giving Fushikizou a Zatto plush.

 
 
 Zatto's underling. He acts as a senior to Sonnamon. He also appeared at Ninjutsu Gakuen's cultural festival, helping out the Health Committee with their booth.

 
 
 In command after Zatto together with Yamamoto. His well-known feature is that he always uses a rice paper to cover his face.

Dokutake Castle
 
 

 
 

 
 

Dokutama
Shibuki
Ibuki
Fubuki
Yamabuki

Other characters
 Rantarō's Mother
 

 
 
 Shinbei's younger sister.

 
 
 Yamada-sensei's 18-year-old son, a free agent ninja. Unlike his father, he is rather handsome. His nickname is Ricky.

 
 
 A bumbling and forgetful pirate captain.

 
 
Tobe-sensei's self-proclaimed rival.

Music
 Opening Themes
"Yūki 100%" by Hikaru Genji (eps. 1-47)
"Yūki 100%" by Hikaru Genji Super 5 (eps. 48-807)
"Yūki 100% (2002)" by Ya-Ya-Yah (eps. 808-1303)
"Yūki 100% (2009)" by Hey! Say! JUMP (eps. 1304-1393)
"Yūki 100% (2010)" by NYC (eps. 1394-1573)
"Yūki 100% (2012)" by Sexy Zone (eps. 1574-1883)
"Yūki 100% (2016)" by Junior Boys (eps. 1884–present)
 Ending Themes
 "Dancing Junk (ダンシング ジャンク)" by Super Monkey's (eps. 1-47)
 "Don't Mind Namida (DON'T MIND 涙 Don't Mind the Tears)" by Hikaru Genji Super 5 (eps. 48-60)
 "Shaking Night" by Hikaru Genji Super 5 (eps. 61-167)
 "Shihou Happou Hijideppou" (First Generation) (四方八方肘鉄砲 （初代）(eps. 168-198)
 "0-Ten Champion (0点チャンピオン 0 Grade Champion)" by Junich&JJr (eps. 200-264)
 "Owara Nai School Days (終わらない SCHOOL DAYS The School Days Never End)" by Junich&JJr (eps. 265-288)
 "Kō Shichai Rare Nai (こうしちゃいられない)" by Junich&JJr (eps. 289-368)
 "Nin-Nin Nintama Ondo (にんにん忍たま音頭)" by SAY S (eps. 369-409)
 "Itsu Datte (いつだってYELL Always Yell)" by Emiri Nakayama (eps. 410–499, 501–504, 506–509, 512–517, 519–522, 524–527, 529-530)
 "Hemu-Hemu Waltz (ヘムヘムのワルツ)" by Hemu-Hemu (episode 500, 505)
 "Tamae Kaki Uta Shinbe We no dan (たまえかきうた しんべヱの段)" by Yuko Bracken (episodes 510, 518, 523, and 528)
 "Memory and Melody" by SPLASH (eps. 531-566)
 "Ai ga Ichiban (愛がいちばん Love's Best)" by Sayuri Ishikawa (eps. 567-647)
 "Shihou Happou Hijideppou (Second Generation) (四方八方肘鉄砲 （2代目）)" by Mayumi Hunaki (eps. 648-807)
 "Sekai ga Hitotsu ni Naru Made (世界がひとつになるまで Until the World is One)" by Ya-Ya-Yah (eps. 808-967)
 "Kaze (風 The Wind)" by Aya Ueto (eps. 968–1,047)
 "Oh!ENKA (桜援歌 (OH!ENKA)" by Kanjani8 (eps. 1,048-1,153)
 "Ai ni Mukatte (愛に向かって)" by Kanjani8 (eps. 1,154-1,303)
 "Yume Iro (夢色 Dream Color)" by Hey! Say! JUMP (eps. 1,304-1,393)
 "Yume no Tane (ゆめのタネ)" by NYC (eps. 1,394-1,573)
 "Kaze wo Kitte (風をきって)" by Sexy Zone (eps. 1,574-1,738)
 "Matta Nante na Shi! (待ったなんてなしっ!)" by Sexy Zone (eps. 1,739-1,883)
 "3-byou Waratte (3秒笑って)" by Junior Boys (eps. 1884–present)

Episodes

A total of 25 series have been broadcast with each season containing a different number of episodes (ranging from 47 in series one to 120 in series two, three and four). Every episode title ends with the phrase no dan (の段 "The step of"). In 2012, special episodes were broadcast to mark the show's 20th anniversary as well as the 15th anniversary of Ojarumaru, the show broadcast in the slot before Nintama Rantarō. Currently, a total of 2,061 episodes have been broadcast as of September 2019 (excluding specials).

Films
A total of two films based on the series have been released in Japan. The first film, Eiga Nintama Rantarō (映画 忍たま乱太郎 Nintama Rantarō the Movie), was released by Shochiku on June 29, 1996. The second film, Gekijō-ban Anime Nintama Rantarō Ninjutsu Gakuen Zenin Shutsudō! no Dan (劇場版アニメ 忍たま乱太郎 忍術学園 全員出動！の段), was released by Warner Bros. Japan on March 12, 2011.

In July 2011, a live action film version directed by Takashi Miike titled Ninja Kids!!! was released. The rights to produce an American version of the film were in negotiations in 2011. A sequel was released on July 6, 2013, called .

Video games

Various video games were released, starting in 1995. Most of them were published by Culture Brain.

Broadcast
The anime series premiered on NHK G on April 10, 1993 and aired in a weekly 30-minute timeslot until March 19, 1994. Since October 3, 1994, the series airs daily on NHK E in a 10-minute timeslot.

See also

References

External links
The official Japanese website
Nintama Rantarō 30th anniversary website

 
1993 anime television series debuts
Japanese children's animated comedy television series
Ajia-do Animation Works
Anime series based on manga
Comedy anime and manga
NHK original programming
Ninja in anime and manga